Ljupčo Andonovski was the tenth Director of the Administration for Security and Counterintelligence (UBK) of Macedonia.

Career
Andonovski was appointed as the Director of UBK in 2015 by Prime Minister Nikola Gruevski.

See also
 Law enforcement in the Republic of Macedonia

References

Living people
Macedonian politicians
People from Veles, North Macedonia
1964 births